The 25-cent piece was the highest-denomination coin minted in the Netherlands during World War II. Struck between 1941 and 1943, the 25-cent coin was worth , or 0.25, of a Dutch guilder. It was made entirely of zinc, and designed by Nico de Haas, a Dutch national-socialist. The respective mintage was of 34,600,000 (1941), (1942), 13,600,000 (1943).

References

Netherlands in World War II
Coins of the Netherlands
Modern obsolete currencies
Currencies of Europe
Zinc and aluminum coins minted in Germany and occupied territories during World War II
Twenty-five-cent coins